AARS or Aars may refer to:

 Aars, a town in Denmark
 Aminoacyl tRNA synthetase (aaRS or ARS), an enzyme
 Association des Amis de l'Art Rupestre Saharien (Association of the Friends of Saharan Rock Art), a French academic organisation
 Paul Aars (1934-2002), an American stock car driver